Aughwick may refer to the following places in the U.S. state of Pennsylvania:

Streams:
Aughwick Creek, a tributary of the Juniata River
Little Aughwick Creek, a tributary of Aughwick Creek

Communities:
Wells Township, Fulton County, Pennsylvania, formerly known as Aughwick Township